Joli Quentin Kansil (born Joel Dennis Gaines  January 27, 1943), is a games inventor of 36 card games, word games, board games, and dice games, and the author of five books.  His most famous game is Bridgette, a two-player bridge game. He was also a teacher in Hawaii, Thailand, Vietnam, and Singapore.

Early years
Kansil was born in Manhattan and lived much of his childhood at the Jersey Shore, graduating Asbury Park High School in 1960 and Rutgers University in 1964.  His first job was as personal assistant to Albert Hodges Morehead, a writer, lexicographer, and the first bridge editor of The New York Times.  In 1965 Kansil moved to Mexico City, where .  After Mexico, he moved to Honolulu, Hawaii and worked as a full-time English teacher at Punahou School.  During these years, he began his many travels to Central America, the Caribbean, South Pacific, South East Asia, and other places including Mongolia, Wallis and Futuna Islands, Antarctica and Greenland.  .

Games career
In 1969, Kansil founded Gamut of Games, Inc. (later Xanadu Leisure, Ltd.) to produce and distribute the games that he and his associate, Philip Orbanes, designed; the games included Bridgette, My Word, Marrakesh, Itinerary, Krakatoa, Knock-on-Word, Montage and others. Through Morehead, Kansil met many famous bridge players including Waldemar von Zedtwitz, a former business partner of Morehead, who played over 30,000 deals of Bridgette and who contributed the funds needed to start Gamut of Games, Inc.

Kansil was honored as Game Inventor of the Year in 1992 at the annual Game Fair in Essen, Germany, and earlier, in 1986, Bridgette was added to GAMES Magazine's Hall of Fame.

In 1973, Kansil co-founded the Hawaii Backgammon Club (now called the Aloha State Backgammon Club), and he promoted this game by organizing many tournaments.  He won the Hawaii State Backgammon Championships twice (1973, 2000), and he placed in the top 16 bracket in Macau (1977), Monte Carlo (1979), St. Moritz, Switzerland (1986) and Tokyo, Japan (also 1986).  Another famous bridge player, Oswald Jacoby, called Joli Quentin Kansil 'the best combination game inventor/game player in the world'.

Author
Kansil is the author of  The Backgammon Quiz Book (Playboy Press, 1979), and he is the editor of the Official Rules of Card Games (U. S. Playing Card Co., 1999).  His MA thesis on John Quincy Adams was published in 1983.  In 2012 Conversations with Opa was published in New York by Prometheus Books. 'The book covers a wide range of topics, notably the origin of the Universe and life on Earth, the conflict between science and religion, the 10 greatest human accomplishments, contentment, and forecasts for the future.

In the 1970s, Kansil wrote many crossword puzzles for The New York Times, and he was the backgammon editor for Games Magazine (1978 to 1983).  A member of the Explorers Club, he was the journalist on the Zancudo-Cocha expedition in Ecuador in 1987, and he made a rare visit to Pitcairn Island in the South Seas that same year.  He wrote articles about both trips for the Explorers Club Journal magazine.

Later years
Kansil has three children and is currently residing in Makati, a prominent city near Manila, in the Philippines, where he is a writer and frequent tournament bridge player.  Besides his work in the field of games, he was active as a member of the board of directors of ASH (Action on Smoking and Health) for 17 years, and he has designed a modernized spelling system and a reform calendar.

References 

1943 births
Living people
Asbury Park High School alumni
People from Monmouth County, New Jersey